Jastrzębie-Zdrój (originally Jastrzemb) is a city in south Poland with 86,632 inhabitants (2021). Its name comes from the Polish words jastrząb ("hawk") and zdrój ("spa" or "spring"). From 1861 until the 20th century, it was a spa village situated in Upper Silesia. It was granted city rights in 1963. Jastrzębie-Zdrój is currently situated in the Silesian Voivodeship (since 1999), previously in Katowice Voivodeship (1975–1998). In the early 1980s, the city was one of main centers of workers' protests, which resulted in creation of Solidarity (see: Jastrzebie-Zdroj 1980 strikes).

History

The first written documentation, relating to this area, date back to around 1305 (Liber fundationis episcopatus Vratislaviensis). Administratively, the town is made up of several old settlements, whose origins go back to the distant past. The original name of the town was Jastrzemb. The origin of the name, which means 'hawk' in Polish, is connected with the legend of the black knight. From the 16th century to the beginning of the 19th century, it was part of the administration of Wodzisław. Between 1858 and 1860, trial excavations of hard coal were performed all over the area of Jastrzębie Dolne. These excavations ended up discovering springs containing iodine and bromine brine solutions. In 1860, the count of Königsdorff acquired the lands and suggested the construction of bath facilities. Thus, in 1862, the health resort of Bad Königsdorff-Jastrzemb was brought into life. Shortly after, the town joined the exclusive circle of the most prestigious health resorts in Europe.

In 1895, the natural health centre was taken over by a Polish doctor, Mikołaj Witczak, who lent great service to the development of health-resort in Bad Königsdorff-Jastrzemb. His managerial skills together with wise investment made Jastrzębie-Zdrój a highly appreciated and fashionable health resort inside the German Empire and the interbellum Poland. Consequently, numerous health facilities were then set up.

In the plebiscite in Silesia in 1921, about 85% of the inhabitants of Jastrzębie Zdrój voted for Poland, a significant part of the inhabitants also took part in the Silesian uprisings in order to unite with Poland. Finally, in 1922, Jastrzębie-Zdrój was incorporated into Poland.

The history of Jastrzębie-Zdrój as a health resort came to its end in the 1960s, when all over the area began the intensive exploitation of coking coal deposits. Within a period of 12 years, five coal mines were set up. Between 1954–1975, Jastrzębie was part of the Wodzisław County. During the time of political transformation in Poland, Jastrzębie-Zdrój went down the annals of Polish modern history as the place where the so-called "the Jastrzębskie Agreement" was concluded. The signing of the protocol initiated the process of political, economic and social changes in Poland.

Population and location
The city itself had 91,723 inhabitants; its density is 1,047.9 per km² (as of January 31, 2012). Jastrzębie-Zdrój ranks as Poland's 36th largest city. Jastrzębie-Zdrój's unemployment rate is lower (7%) than the national average of 8.8% (as of November 2010).

Districts
Jastrzębie-Zdrój is a powiat (county) divided into 15 districts and 6 sołectwos that have its own administrative body. Most of the districts are suburban, some are densely built with many blocks of flats generating huge housing estates, and the rest are of civic nature.

 Arki Bożka (6,632 inhabitants)
 Barbary (10,185 inhabitants)
 Bogoczowiec (1,672 inhabitants)
 Chrobrego (5,042 inhabitants)
 Gwarków (8,126 inhabitants)
 Jastrzębie Górne i Dolne (4,369 inhabitants)
 Morcinka (4,534 inhabitants)
 Pionierów (11,210 inhabitants)
 Przyjaźń (4,718 inhabitants)
 Staszica (6,079 inhabitants)
 Tuwima (480 inhabitants)	
 Tysiąclecia (3,242 inhabitants)
 Zdrój	(7,682 inhabitants)
 Złote łany (1,118 inhabitants)
 Zofiówka (3,473 inhabitants)

Sołectwos:
 Borynia (1,918 inhabitants)
 Bzie (3,602 inhabitants)
 Moszczenica (3,026 inhabitants)
 Ruptawa (3,767 inhabitants)
 Skrzeczkowice (694 inhabitants)
 Szeroka (2,273 inhabitants)

Sports

 The most famous clubs
 GKS Jastrzębie – men's professional football club
 Jastrzębski Węgiel – men's professional volleyball club, two–time Polish Champion, PlusLiga
 JKH GKS Jastrzębie – men's professional ice hockey club, Polska Hokej Liga

 Other clubs
 BKS Jastrzębie – boxing
 UKH Białe Jastrzębie – women's ice hockey
 LKS Granica Ruptawa – football
 LKS Zryw Bzie – football
 LKS Hadex Szeroka – football
 Koka Jastrzębie – judo
 UKS Romi Jastrzębie – women's handball

Notable people
 Henryk Sławik (1894–1944), Polish politician, social worker, activist, and diplomat, who during World War II helped save over 30,000 Polish refugees, including 5,000 Polish Jews in Budapest, Hungary by giving them false Polish passports with Catholic designation
 Urszula Wybraniec-Skardowska (born 1940), Polish logician
 Krystian Lupa (born 1943), Polish theatre director, set designer, playwright, translator and pedagogue
 Magdalena Lewy-Boulet (born 1973), American athlete
 Marcin Radzewicz (born 1980), Polish footballer
 Dariusz Kłus (born 1981), Polish footballer
 Łukasz Pielorz (born 1983), Polish footballer
 Kamil Glik (born 1988), Polish footballer
 Michał Skóraś (born 2000), Polish footballer

Twin towns – sister cities

Jastrzębie-Zdrój is twinned with:

 Borshchiv, Ukraine (2017)
 Havířov, Czech Republic (2007)
 Ibbenbüren, Germany (2007)
 Karviná, Czech Republic (1995)
 Prievidza, Slovakia (2009)
 Tourcoing, France (2007)

References

External links
 Municipal homepage
 Jewish Community in Jastrzębie-Zdrój on Virtual Shtetl

 
Cities and towns in Silesian Voivodeship
Jastrzebie-Zdroj
Spa towns in Poland
Socialist planned cities